Tidal heating of Io (also known as tidal working) occurs through the tidal friction processes between Jupiter and its moon. Orbital and rotational energy are dissipated as heat in the crust of the moon. Io has a similar mass and size as the Moon, but Io is the most geologically active body in the Solar System. This is caused by the heating mechanism of Io. The major heating source of Earth and its moon is radioactive heating, but the heating source on Io is tidal heating. As Jupiter is very massive, the side of Io nearest to Jupiter has a slightly larger gravitational pull than the opposite side. This difference in gravitational forces cause distortion of Io’s shape. Differently from the Earth’s only moon, Jupiter has two other large moons (Europa and Ganymede) that are in an orbital resonance with it. Io is the innermost of this set of resonant moons, and their interactions maintain its orbit in an eccentric (elliptical) state. The varying distance between Jupiter and Io continually changes the degree of distortion of Io's shape and flexes its interior, frictionally heating it. The friction-induced heating drives strong volcanic activities on the surface of Io.

Although there is general agreement that the cause of the heat as manifested in Io's many volcanoes is tidal heating from the pull of gravity from Jupiter and its moon Europa, the volcanoes are not in the positions predicted with tidal heating.  They are shifted 30 to 60 degrees to the East.  A study published in 2015, explains the eastern shift by an ocean of molten rock under the surface. The movement of this magma would generate extra heat. Liquids, especially if they are sticky (or viscous), can produce heat through friction. The team who wrote the paper believe that the subsurface ocean is a mixture of molten and solid rock. When the molten rock flows, it may swirl and rub against the surrounding rock, thus generating heat.

Other moons in the Solar System undergo tidal heating, and they too may have more heat generated by this process, including heat from the movement of water.  This ability to generate heat in a subsurface ocean increases the chance of life on bodies like Europa and Enceladus.

References

External links 
 Tidal Heating tutorial

Io (moon)